Lorne Argyle Campbell (March 1871 – April 29, 1947) was a businessman and political figure in British Columbia. He represented Rossland City from 1912 to 1916 in the Legislative Assembly of British Columbia as a Conservative.

Biography
He was born in Perth, Ontario, the son of John G. Campbell and Helen Gray Murdoch, and was educated at Perth Collegiate. He was first employed with Edison General Electric in Toronto in 1889. In 1891, he was hired by Canadian General Electric; he became chief engineer for the company in 1896. In 1898, he went to British Columbia after being hired by West Kootenay Power and Light Co. In 1903, Campbell married Mary Spahr Hosier. He was president of Cascade Power and Light Co. and of McGillivray Creek Coal & Coke Ltd. of Alberta. Campbell served in the provincial cabinet as Minister of Mines. Campbell was an unsuccessful candidate for a seat in the provincial assembly in 1907. He was defeated by William David Willson when he ran for reelection in the newly created riding of Rossland in 1916. He died in Rossland at the age of 76.

References 

1871 births
1947 deaths
British Columbia Conservative Party MLAs
People from Perth, Ontario
People from Rossland, British Columbia